Altin Rrica (born 13 December 1973) is an Albanian retired footballer who played for Besa Kavajë, KF Tirana, Partizani Tirana and Shqiponja Gjirokastër as well as the Albania national team.

Club career

Career ending accident
His career came to an abrupt end at the age of 27 on 22 July 2000 following an accident sustained by the rocks at Lake Ohrid which left him permanently disabled from the waist down. While in pre-season with Shqiponja Gjirokastër, Rrica jumped into the lake and crushed into the rocks knocking him unconscious.

International career
He made his debut for Albania in a February 2000 Rothmans International Tournament match against Andorra and earned his second and final cap during the same tournament against hosts Malta.

References

External links

1973 births
Living people
Footballers from Kavajë
Albanian footballers
Association football midfielders
Albania international footballers
Besa Kavajë players
KF Tirana players
FK Partizani Tirana players
Luftëtari Gjirokastër players
Kategoria Superiore players
Albanian people with disabilities